Tory Verdi is an American women's basketball coach with the UMass Minutewomen basketball team of the Atlantic 10 Conference. He was named to the position on April 9, 2016.

Head coaching record
Sources:

 IVY League
 Columbia Record Book
 MAC 2012-13 Women's Basketball Standings
 MAC 2013-14 Women's Basketball Standings
 MAC 2014-15 Women's Basketball Standings
 MAC 2015-16 Women's Basketball Standings
 Eastern Michigan Media Guide
 UMASS Women's Basketball 2016-17
 NCAA Stats

Personal
Verdi is from New Britain, Connecticut and graduated from Keene State College in New Hampshire in 1996 with a degree in elementary education. He earned a master's degree in computer technology from the University of Hartford.

References

External links
 UMass bio

Year of birth missing (living people)
Living people
American women's basketball coaches
Basketball coaches from Connecticut
Columbia Lions women's basketball coaches
Connecticut Sun coaches
Eastern Michigan Eagles women's basketball coaches
Kansas Jayhawks women's basketball coaches
Keene State College alumni
Nebraska Cornhuskers women's basketball coaches
Sportspeople from New Britain, Connecticut
UMass Minutewomen basketball coaches
University of Hartford alumni